KF Drita is a basketball club based in Gjilan, Kosovo (Gjilan is the Albanian name of the town).

Created in 1958, the club won the Basketball Superleague of Kosovo in 1996. KF Drita also has a women's club.

History
The club was formed in 1958 with the name "Drita" which means "light" in the Albanian language. The name was taken from other sports clubs in the city.

Roster

References

External links
Eurobasket.com Team Profile

Basketball teams established in 1958
Basketball teams in Yugoslavia
Basketball teams in Kosovo
KB Drita